Jason Fowler may refer to:

 Jason Fowler (footballer) (born 1974), English former professional footballer
 Jason Fowler (musician) (born 1971), American musician
 Jason Fowler (dancer), American ballet dancer